Earth 2: Special Low Frequency Version, also known as simply Earth 2, is the first full-length studio album by the American drone metal band Earth. Produced by Earth and Stuart Hallerman, it was released on February 5, 1993, on Sub Pop Records. The album was highly influential in the development of the drone music and drone metal genres.

Background
At the time of Earth's formation, bandleader Dylan Carlson was conceptually influenced by minimalist composers such as La Monte Young as well the bands King Crimson and Slayer. As a child, Carlson was a fan of classic rock groups such as AC/DC, noting that "when I would hear a song and there’d be a cool riff or a cool part of the song I was always like, 'Oh, what would it be like if they stayed on that instead of moving on to the next part?' Then I read about minimalism and stuff like that. I was like, 'Oh, what if we take a Slayer-style riff and play it for 20 minutes at half speed?' I guess you could say that was my one good idea."

The recent advent of compact discs allowed for playing times up to 74 minutes, which encouraged the group to "fill up an entire CD with one song in three parts." However, recording tape only allowed for 30 minutes max at the time, so that the band needed to "sort of splice it or fade it in and fade up, stuff like that" to achieve the longer recording. The group were signed to grunge label Sub Pop, but Carlson explained that "what we did was not grunge and not part of that whole thing. A lot of people I think that bought the records saying Sub Pop expecting something were disappointed." He noted that "luckily I wore a Morbid Angel t-shirt on the back of the album and so metal fans were sort of the first to really embrace what we were doing."

Critical reception
Celebrated as a "milestone" by Terrorizer'''s Dayal Patterson, he described it as "a three-track, 75 minute deluge of feedback and distorted guitars that marked the blueprint for what lead singer/guitarist Dylan Carlson at the time coined 'ambient metal'". AllMusic's John Bush called the album a "glacial, monolithic exercise" which "virtually created the drone and ambient metal subgenres." Critic Ned Raggett of Allmusic gave the album a positive review, stating: "If Carlson and his bassist du jour, in this case Dave Harwell, weren't quite Sub Pop's answer to the ranges of UK guitar extremism from the likes of Godflesh, Main, and Skullflower, Earth still came pretty darn close to it, creating a record even the Melvins would find weird." He added: "Earth 2'' dedicates itself to the proposition that there's no such thing as too loud, trudging, or doom-laden." while describing the closing track as "ambient music completely and totally suffused with threat and fuzz."

Alan Licht, in his third list of minimalist classics, wrote "Unlike a lot of more recent noise underground stuff, which (to me) is relatively factorable, this is technically boggling drone music--the sustain is achieved not just with distortion but through overdubbing, and there's clean guitars in there too--even on headphones it's hard to tell what the fuck they're really doing. On this album, Earth set up a drone and place a few choice metal riffs against it over the course of forty minutes, at which point they just let the drone chord ring for another half hour... Hard to remember how completely unfashionable this was in the heyday of grunge..."

Track listing

Personnel
Dylan Carlson – guitar
Dave Harwell – bass guitar
Joe Burns – percussion on "Like Gold and Faceted"

References

External links

1993 debut albums
Earth (American band) albums
Sub Pop albums